North Macedonia, previously presented in the contest as the Former Yugoslav Republic of Macedonia (F.Y.R. Macedonia), has participated in the Junior Eurovision Song Contest 16 times since their debut in the inaugural  contest. Macedonian Radio Television (MRT) is responsible for the country's participation in the contest.

History

North Macedonia debuted in the inaugural 2003 contest in Copenhagen, Denmark, represented by the song "Ti ne me poznavaš" performed by Marija and Viktorija. The song placed 12th in a field of 16 countries.

MRT did not participate in 2012 due to issues with the voting process in the contest and the lack of budget available for participation. However, North Macedonia returned to the contest in 2013, held in Kyiv, Ukraine. North Macedonia did not return to the contest in 2014, but returned again in 2015. MRT did not participate in the  due to the COVID-19 pandemic, but returned to the 2021 contest in France.

Participation overview

Gallery

Commentators and spokespersons

See also 
North Macedonia in the Eurovision Song Contest
North Macedonia in the Turkvision Song Contest

References

 
Countries in the Junior Eurovision Song Contest
Macedonian music